Frank Lester (1870 – after 1900) was an English professional footballer who played as a full back. He made 68 appearances in the Football League for Small Heath.

Lester was born in Wednesbury, Staffordshire. He played football for Walsall Unity before joining First Division club Small Heath. They were relegated in 1895–96, Lester's first season with the club, but the next season he formed a sound fullback partnership with Billy Pratt. However, the arrival of Arthur Archer as first-choice right back meant Lester was in competition with Pratt for the left-back position, which restricted his appearances. He contributed to Small Heath's runners-up finish in 1900–01 season, thereby winning promotion back to the top flight, but left the club for Walsall later the same year.

References

1870 births
Year of death missing
Sportspeople from Wednesbury
English footballers
Association football fullbacks
Birmingham City F.C. players
Walsall F.C. players
Date of birth missing
Place of death missing